Carrier tilt is a wear issue that can arise in some gas piston-based firearm operating systems. High pressure gas pushes the gas piston back hitting the bolt carrier.  This force pushes the bolt carrier down into the buffer tube wall. This can lead to increased wear, shaved and/or chipped metal.  This in turn can lead to a loss of accuracy.

Solutions
Colt says that by allowing the operating rod to wiggle the downward force is alleviated and shifted rearward instead.  Conversely, Adams Arms cites loose or sloppy tolerances inside the receiver as root source of the problem and thus utilizes a single-piece carrier to solve the problem. Other companies solve this issue modifying the carrier length.  Black Rifle Arms utilizing a shorted carrier to accommodate a polymer based buffer and Patriot Ordnance Factory using a lengthened carrier, sporting an extended lower lip.

References

Firearms
Firearm terminology